Sérgio von Puttkammer, best known by the stage name Viana Júnior (1941 or 1942 – June 7, 2010), was a Brazilian comedian and actor.

The comedian is best remembered for the character Apolônio, who acted with A Velha Surda (The Old Deaf Woman, in Portuguese) character on A Praça É Nossa, a SBT TV show.

Viana Júnior died on June 7, 2010, at his home in Itanhaém, São Paulo. The cause of death was multiple organ failure.

References

External links

Viana Júnior at TeleHistória website (in Portuguese)

1940s births
2010 deaths
Deaths from multiple organ failure
Brazilian male comedians
Brazilian male film actors
Brazilian male telenovela actors
Brazilian male television actors
People from Itanhaém